The Sunbury Kangaroos Football Club,. nicknamed the Kangaroos, is an Australian rules football club, previously known as Sunbury Rovers and situated 40km north west of Melbourne in the town of Sunbury and affiliated with the Essendon District Football League. 

Originally known as the Sunbury Rovers, the team was formed so the town Sunbury had a team in both divisions of RDFL. Formed in 1987 to compete in the second division of the league. The Rovers always struggled because the better players would join the more established club, Fortunes improved when Sunbury FC left for the Ballarat Football League. The club changed to the Kangaroos after incentives from the North Melbourne Football Club to do so.

The Kangaroos joined EDFL Women's ranks in 2018 and performed well, now the men's teams transfer ensures that all the club's senior teams, including its Reserves and Under 19s, will play with the EDFL from 2019 onward.

Premierships
 Riddell District Football League / Essendon District Football League  
Seniors  2012, 2019
Reserves  2006, 2007, 2014, 2015, 2017, 2019

References

Further reading
 History of Football in the Bendigo District - John Stoward -

External links
 Sunbury Kangaroos Junior Football Club

Essendon District Football League clubs
1987 establishments in Australia
Sunbury, Victoria
Australian rules football clubs established in 1987
Australian rules football clubs in Victoria (Australia)
Sport in the City of Hume